Barry Young may refer to:
Barry Young (cricketer) (born 1975), English cricketer
Barry Young (footballer) (born 1970), Australian rules footballer
Barry Young (musician) (1931–1966), American pop singer
Wolfgang (wrestler) (born 1986), English professional wrestler born Barry Young